North Liberty is a city in Johnson County, Iowa, United States. It is a suburb of Iowa City and part of the Iowa City Metropolitan Statistical Area.

As of the 2020 census, the city population was 20,479. From 2000 to 2010, North Liberty was the second fastest-growing city in Iowa. A 2017 LendEDU poll named North Liberty the ninth most educated city in the United States and the most educated city in the Midwest.

History
The North Liberty area was first settled in 1838 by John Gaylor and Alonzo C. Dennison. It was originally known as "Big Bottom" or "North Bend" (in reference to its location near the bend of the Iowa River) by its earliest settlers and was later known as "Squash Bend" before the city was platted as North Liberty in 1857.

North Liberty incorporated on November 10, 1913, at which time its population was approximately 190.
Population growth accelerated in the 1960s, and the Iowa City Community School District opened Penn Elementary there in 1961. A 1967 special census placed the city's population at 782, and by 1980 the population had grown to over 2,000. In 1984, in response to the population growth, the North Liberty Community Library  was founded, and Penn Meadows Park, the city's largest, was opened. By 2000, the population of the city was over 5,000. The city had established its own police and fire departments and built a community center with library and aquatic park, as well as a city administration building. The city has since continued to grow, with a population of 7,224 in a 2004 special census. In 2007, the population was estimated to be 10,982, making North Liberty the second fastest-growing city in Iowa.  According to the 2010 U.S. census the population of North Liberty had increased to 13,374.

Geography
North Liberty is located at  (41.743029, -91.607807).

North Liberty is located on the Iowan erosion surface. Drivers on I-380 experience an abrupt transition from the muted topography of the Iowan surface to the rolling hills of the Southern Iowa drift plain, four miles south of North Liberty.

Demographics

2010 census
As of the census of 2010, there were 13,374 people, 5,492 households, and 3,262 families living in the city. The racial makeup of the city was 90.2% White, 4.5% African American, 0.2% Native American, 1.8% Asian, 0.9% from other races, and 2.3% from two or more races. Hispanic or Latino of any race were 3.5% of the population.

There were 5,492 households, of which 37.0% had children under the age of 18 living with them, 46.4% were married couples living together, 9.7% had a female householder with no husband present, 3.3% had a male householder with no wife present, and 40.6% were non-families. 27.6% of all households were made up of individuals, and 3% had someone living alone who was 65 years of age or older. The average household size was 2.44 and the average family size was 3.08.

The median age in the city was 29.2 years. 28.1% of residents were under the age of 18; 9% were between the ages of 18 and 24; 44% were from 25 to 44; 15.3% were from 45 to 64; and 3.5% were 65 years of age or older. The gender makeup of the city was 49.0% male and 51.0% female.

2000 census
As of the census of 2000, there were 5,367 people, 2,259 households, and 1,400 families living in the city. The racial makeup of the city was 95.38% White, 1.53% African American, 0.17% Native American, 0.82% Asian, 0.11% Pacific Islander, 0.78% from other races, and 1.21% from two or more races. Hispanic or Latino of any race were 2.38% of the population.

There were 2,259 households, out of which 35.4% had children under the age of 18 living with them, 48.6% were married couples living together, 9.6% had a female householder with no husband present, and 38.0% were non-families. 27.6% of all households were made up of individuals, and 3.7% had someone living alone who was 65 years of age or older. The average household size was 2.38 and the average family size was 2.95.

26.8% are under the age of 18, 11.5% from 18 to 24, 43.9% from 25 to 44, 13.8% from 45 to 64, and 4.1% who were 65 years of age or older. The median age was 29 years. For every 100 females, there were 98.0 males. For every 100 females age 18 and over, there were 96.2 males.

Education
A majority of North Liberty residents live within the boundaries of the Iowa City Community School District, while the area west of Jones Boulevard (and the Deerfield Subdivision) belongs to the Clear Creek–Amana Community School District.

Public schools in or serving students from North Liberty include the following:
 From the Iowa City Community School District:
 Buford Garner Elementary
 Penn Elementary
 Van Allen Elementary
 Christine Grant Elementary 
 North Central Junior High
Liberty High (North Liberty)
West High (Iowa City)
 From the Clear Creek–Amana Community School District:
 North Bend Elementary
 Clear Creek–Amana Middle School (Tiffin)
 Clear Creek–Amana High School (Tiffin)
Oak Hill Elementary (Tiffin)

A 2017 poll by LendEDU gave North Liberty an Education Grade of 84.51, placing it 9th among its Top 500 Most Educated Cities. North Liberty is the only non-coastal city listed in the top 10. According to the study, the number of advanced-degree holding residents has a strong correlation with several social goods, including "a good number of high paying jobs in the area, an excellent schooling system to educate the next generation, nearby higher education institutions, and more."

Infrastructure
The sewage from the city is treated at a modern and sophisticated treatment plant using Membrane Bio-Reactor(MBR) technology followed by UV sterilization. It is designed to be able to discharge more than 2 million gallons of high-quality effluent to Muddy Creek each day.

VLBA node
The radio telescope located northeast of North Liberty (designation "NL") on Mehaffey Bridge Road is one of ten dishes comprising the Very Long Baseline Array (VLBA).

Notable person
 Jean Prahm, Olympic bobsledder

References

External links
 City of North Liberty

Cities in Johnson County, Iowa
Cities in Iowa
Iowa City metropolitan area
1838 establishments in Iowa Territory